Ludwig Busbetzky (Lovies Busbetsky ; Busbet) was an Estonian organist and composer during the 17th century. Coming from a family of musicians, Busbetzky studied with Dieterich Buxtehude in Lübeck around 1680.

From 1687 to 1699 Busbetzky was the organist at the German church in Narva.

Only two of his compositions are known to have survived, both of which have been previously attributed to Buxtehude.
 Erbarm dich mein ô Herre Gott for soprano, alto, tenor, bass, 2 violins, 2 violas, bassoon or violone, and continuo.
 Laudate Dominum for soprano, 2 violins, bassoon or violone, and continuo.

See also
Culture of Estonia

References 

Estonian organists
Male organists
17th-century classical musicians
People from Narva
Baroque composers
Estonian composers
17th-century Estonian people
Year of birth missing
Year of death missing
18th-century keyboardists
Male classical composers
17th-century male musicians